Old South Arabian (or Ṣayhadic or Yemenite) is a group of four closely related extinct languages spoken in the far southern portion of the Arabian Peninsula. They were written in the Ancient South Arabian script.

There were a number of other Old South Arabian languages (e.g. Awsānian), of which very little evidence has survived, however. A pair of possible surviving Sayhadic languages is attested in the Razihi language and Faifi language spoken in far north-west of Yemen, though these varieties of speech have both Arabic and Sayhadic features, and it is difficult to classify them as either Arabic dialects with a Sayhadic substratum, or Sayhadic languages that have been restructured under pressure of Arabic.

Classification issues 
It was originally thought that all four members of this group were dialects of one Old South Arabian language, but in the mid-twentieth century, linguist A.F.L. Beeston finally proved that they did in fact constitute independent languages.

The Old South Arabian languages were originally classified (partly on the basis of geography) as South Semitic, along with Arabic, Modern South Arabian and Ethiopian Semitic; more recently however, a new classification has come in use which places Old South Arabian, along with Arabic, Ugaritic, Aramaic and Canaanite/Hebrew in a Central Semitic group; leaving Modern South Arabian and Ethiopic in a separate group. This new classification is based on Arabic, Old South Arabian and Northwest Semitic (Ugaritic, Aramaic and Canaanite) sharing an innovation in the verbal system, an imperfect taking the form *yVqtVl-u (the other groups have *yVqattVl); Nebes showed that Sabaean at least had the form yVqtVl in the imperfect.

Even though it has been now accepted that the four main languages be considered independent, they are clearly closely related linguistically and derive from a common ancestor because they share certain morphological innovations. One of the most important isoglosses retained in all four languages is the suffixed definite article -(h)n. There are however significant differences between the languages.

The four main Sayhadic languages were: Sabaean, Minaeic (or Madhabic), Qatabanic, and Hadramitic.

Sayhadic had its own writing system, the Ancient South Arabian Monumental Script, or Ms3nd, consisting of 29 graphemes concurrently used for proto-Geʿez in the Kingdom of Dʿmt, ultimately sharing a common origin with the other Semitic abjads, the Proto-Sinaitic alphabet. Inscriptions in another minuscule cursive script written on wooden sticks have also been discovered.

The last inscription of these languages dates back to 554 CE, 60 years before the appearance of Islam.

Languages 
Old South Arabian comprised a number of languages; the following are those that have been preserved in writing (the dates follow the so-called long chronology). Besides these, at least Razihi may be a surviving Old South Arabian language.

 Sabaean: the language of the kingdom of Saba and later also of Ḥimyar; also documented in the Eritrean kingdom of Da'amot; very well documented, ca. 6000 Inscriptions
 Old Sabaean: 8th until 2nd century BC.
 Middle Sabaean: 1st century BC until the 4th century AD (the best documented language)
 Ḥaramitic: the language of the area to the north of Ma'īn
 Central Sabaean: the language of the inscriptions from the Sabaean heartland
 South Sabaean: the language of the inscriptions from Radman and Ḥimyar
 "Pseudo-Sabaean": the literary language of Arabian tribes in Najrān, Haram and Qaryat al-Fāw
 Late Sabaean: 5th and 6th centuries AD.
 Minaean: (also called Madhabian): the language of the city states in al-Jawf − with the exception of Haram − especially the later sparsely populated state of Ma'in (recorded from the 8th until 2nd century BC). Inscriptions have also been found outside Ma'īn in the commercial colonies of Dedan and Madā'in Ṣāliḥ, in Egypt and also on Delos. (ca. 500 inscriptions)
 Qatabānian: the language of the kingdom of Qatabān, recorded from the 5th century BC until the 2nd century (barely 2000 inscriptions)
 Awsānian: the language of the kingdom of Awsān, poorly recorded (ca. 25 inscriptions, 8th/ 1st century BC until about the 1st century AD). Indistinguishable from Qatabānian.
 Other varieties such as the language of the tribe of Radmān
 Hadramautic (or Ḥaḑramitic): the language of Ḥaḑramaut, with an additional inscription from the Greek island of Delos. 5th century BC until the 4th century AD, with ca. 1000 inscriptions.

Written records 
Old South Arabian was written in the Old South Arabian script, a consonantal abjad deriving from the Phoenician alphabet. Compared with other parts of the ancient world, Palestine for instance, the number of surviving inscriptions is very high. Something in the region of 10,000 inscriptions exist. The Sabaean lexicon contains about 2,500 words.

Categories of written records 
 Inscriptions in stone
 Votive inscriptions, which often preserve historical accounts of the events that led to the dedication
 Inscriptions on buildings: give the names of the person who commissioned the work and the historical circumstances among other things
 Laws and legislation
 Protocols and deeds
 Inscriptions written for atonement or repentance
 Graffiti on rocks
 Literary texts: if large numbers of any such texts ever existed, they have been almost completely lost
 Inscriptions on wooden cylinders (only Middle Sabaean and Hadramite). There are about 1000 so far; very few published, mostly from Nashshān, in Wādī Madhāb.
 Private texts
 Contracts and orders
 Inscriptions on everyday objects

The inscriptions on stone display a very formal and precise wording and expression, whereas the style of the wooden inscriptions written in the cursive script is much more informal.

Phonology

History of research and teaching 
Although the inscriptions from ancient South Arabia were already known by the 18th century, it was Wilhelm Gesenius (1786-1842) and his student Emil Rödiger who finally undertook the deciphering of the script, actually independently of each other, in the years 1841/42. Then in the second half of the 19th century Joseph Halévy and Eduard Glaser brought hundreds of Old South Arabian inscriptions, possible tracings and copies back to Europe. On the basis of this large amount of material Fritz Hommel prepared a selection of texts in 1893 along with an attempt at a grammar. Later on the Sabaean expert Nikolaus Rhodokanakis made especially important steps towards understanding Old South Arabian. A completely new field of Old South Arabian script and texts has been opened up since the 1970s by the discovery of wooden cylinders on which Sabaean has been written with a pen. The unknown script and numerous incomprehensible words presented Sabaean studies with new problems, and to this day the wooden cylinders are not completely understood.

In the German-speaking world, Old South Arabian is taught in the framework of Semitic Studies, and no independent university chair has been dedicated to Old South Arabian (or Sabaean) Studies. Learning Old South Arabian at least furthers the student’s knowledge of the characteristics of Semitic by introducing him or her to a less well-preserved example of the group. Students normally begin to learn the grammar of Old South Arabian and then they finally read a few of the longer texts.

See also 
 Ancient North Arabian
 Old Arabic
 Undeciphered -k language of ancient Yemen
 Modern South Arabian languages

References

Bibliography 
Short introductions and overviews
 N. Nebes, P. Stein: Ancient South Arabian, in: Roger D. Woodard (Hrsg.): The Cambridge encyclopedia of the World's ancient languages Cambridge University Press, Cambridge 2004  S. 454-487 (Up to date grammatical sketch with Bibliography).
 Peter Stein: Ancient South Arabian. In: Stefan Weninger (Hrsg.): The Semitic Languages: An International Handbook. De Gruyter Mouton, Berlin 2011, pp. 1042–1073.

Grammars
 A. F. L. Beeston: Sabaic Grammar, Manchester 1984 .
 Maria Höfner: Altsüdarabische Grammatik (Porta Linguarum Orientalium, Band 24) Leipzig, 1943.
 
 N. Nebes, P. Stein: Ancient South Arabian, in: Roger D. Woodard (Hrsg.): The Cambridge encyclopedia of the World's ancient languages Cambridge University Press, Cambridge 2004  S. 454-487 (most recent grammatical overview with bibliography).
 Mounir Arbach: Le madhabien: lexique, onomastique et grammaire d'une langue de l'Arabie méridionale préislamique. (Tomes 1-3) Aix-en-Provence, 1993 (Includes a grammar, a lexicon and a list of Minaean personal names)

Dictionaries
 A. F. L. Beeston, M. A. Ghul, W. W. Müller, J. Ryckmans: Sabaic Dictionary / Dictionnaire sabéen /al-Muʿdscham as-Sabaʾī (Englisch-Französisch-Arabisch) Louvain-la-Neuve, 1982 
 Joan Copeland Biella: Dictionary of Old South Arabic. Sabaean dialect Eisenbrauns, 1982 
 S.D. Ricks: Lexicon of Inscriptional Qatabanian (Studia Pohl, 14), Pontifical Biblical Institute, Rome 1989

Collections of texts
 Alessandra Avanzini: Corpus of South Arabian Inscriptions I-III. Qatabanic, Marginal Qatabanic, Awsanite Inscriptions (Arabia Antica 2). Ed. PLUS, Pisa 2004. 
 Barbara Jändl: Altsüdarabische Inschriften auf Metall (Epigraphische Forschungen auf der Arabischen Halbinsel 4). Tübingen, Berlin 2009. 
 Jacques Ryckmans, Walter W. Müller, Yusuf M. Abdallah: Textes du Yémen antique. Inscrits sur bois (Publications de l'Institut Orientaliste de Louvain 43). Institut Orientaliste, Louvain 1994. 
 Peter Stein: Die altsüdarabischen Minuskelinschriften auf Holzstäbchen aus der Bayerischen Staatsbibliothek in München 1: Die Inschriften der mittel- und spätsabäischen Periode (Epigraphische Forschungen auf der Arabischen Halbinsel 5). Tübingen, 2010. 

Languages attested from the 8th century BC
 
Semitic languages
South Arabia